Radio Philippines Network, Inc. (RPN) is a Philippine television and radio company based in Quezon City. It is the flagship media property of Nine Media Corporation of the ALC Group of Companies; along with the Presidential Communications Office (PCO) and Far East Managers and Investors Inc. (owned by the family of company founder Roberto Benedicto), among others, as major shareholders. The network's main offices and transmitter is located at Panay Avenue, Brgy. South Triangle also in Quezon City. Founded by Roberto Benedicto and prior to its privatization, it was the sister station of current government owned and controlled Intercontinental Broadcasting Corporation and formerly an attached agency of the now-PCO, despite having 20% minority stake in ownership.

Radio Philippines Network operates television stations with airtime being leased by its parent Nine Media, serving as primary broadcasters of CNN Philippines, a local franchise of the Cable News Network. RPN also operates regional AM radio stations under the brand Radyo Ronda, serving as partial affiliate of sister station DWIZ in Metro Manila.

History

As Kanlaon Broadcasting System (1960–1975)

Early years (1960-1972) 
Radio Philippines Network was founded on February 25, 1960, with the Congress of the Philippines approved its franchise on June 19, 1960. Instead of using its franchise name, the network instead first used Kanlaon Broadcasting System as its initial branding. Kanlaon is a volcano on the Philippine island of Negros, the home of its founder Roberto Benedicto. Kanlaon Broadcasting System started broadcasting as a radio network with its first station DZBI in Manila. By 1967, KBS had expanded operations with seven radio stations all over the country, namely, DZRR and DZAX in Manila, DZBS in Baguio, DZTG in Tuguegarao, DZRL in Laoag (later moved to Batac), DXXX in Zamboanga and DXDX in Dadiangas. Philippine radio veteran Ben Aniceto was the operations director at the time.

The network began broadcasting for television on October 15, 1969, with the launch of KBS-9 Manila as the network's flagship TV station. KBS-12 Baguio also went on air in the same year.

In 1970, KBS also acquired a color-ready production truck (OB van) for the remote broadcasts of major news events and sports coverages. The network also pioneered newscasting on television, as they launched the first ever newspaper-format nightly newscast titled NewsWatch. Back then, broadcast hours were limited to late afternoons up to around midnight; except for Sundays, when the channel begins transmissions after midday.

In 1971, KBS becomes firmly established as an all-color television network, consisting of ten full powered provincial stations, strategically situated in Baguio (KBS-12), Laoag (KBS-9), Bicol (KBS-10 in Iriga), Iloilo (KBS-8), Bacolod (KBS-8), Cebu (KBS-9 in Mandaue), Davao (KBS-9), General Santos (KBS-7) and Butuan (KBS-4) alongside the flagship station (KBS-9) in Manila.

Martial law KBS years and ABS-CBN takeover (1972-1975) 
On September 23, 1972, the KBS television and radio stations and the newspaper publication Philippines Daily Express, all belonging to the Roberto Benedicto group, were allowed to operate during the martial law period with the former airing Wacky Races and Francisco Tatad's reading of Proclamation No. 1081, where most of the media outfits were closed down after the declaration of martial law with Proclamation No. 1081 by Ferdinand Marcos.

On September 28, 1972, Marcos ordered the takeover of the ABS-CBN Broadcasting Corporation and turned over its facilities to KBS, controlled by Marcos crony Benedicto. ABS-CBN's facilities were later transferred from KBS to the government-owned Maharlika Broadcasting System. Crony-owned media companies broadcast or published news and entertainment meant to project a positive image for the dictatorship and conceal its abuses.

Properties and funding for KBS network partly came from ABS-CBN in the form of its old headquarters along Roxas Boulevard and equipment from Toshiba enabling them to broadcast in color. As a result, on its launch it was branded Accucolor 9 – an RPN station ("Accucolor" is the name of the color technology used) as the first Philippine television network to launch in full color.

In 1973, RPN brought the first slow-motion machine to support the coverage of the MICAA basketball games. Color production with color-ready equipment would enable the government to invest in RPN for color coverages of national events, as then state network GTV (now PTV), which began two years later after the beginning of martial law, was mostly monochrome before its first color broadcasts in 1976. In 1974, the KBS network grew with the opening of more stations in Tuguegarao (KBS-9), Bayombong (KBS-7), Legazpi (KBS-2), Palawan (KBS-5), Roxas (KBS-7), Dumaguete (KBS-5 moved to RPN-8), Tacloban (KBS-5), Zamboanga (KBS-5), Dipolog (KBS-5), Pagadian (KBS-5), Ozamiz (KBS-9), Cagayan de Oro (KBS-5), Surigao (KBS-4) and Cotabato (KBS-10).

The first Radio Philippines Network (1975–1989)

Benedicto ownership (1975–1986)
In 1975, KBS formally relaunched as RPN, the acronym for its franchise name, Radio Philippines Network (the RPN name was first used in the provincial stations before the RPN brand would later be used for the Manila station as well; the KBS name was also used for other aspects such as KBS Sports until 1986). The network covered special events such as the Olympic Games (it is also the first sporting coverage to broadcast in full color), Thrilla in Manila in 1975; and also became the official broadcaster for the Miss Universe pageant held in Manila in 1974, and the first Metropop Song Festival and its succeeding editions from 1978. The network also headlined some top-rated programs such as John en Marsha (which both the media and academe regarded the show as the paradigm of development communication), Flordeluna and Superstar (formerly known as The Nora Aunor-Eddie Peregrina Show). RPN became the birthplace and the first humble abode of the now longest running daytime variety show  Eat Bulaga! (premiering in 1979); as well as the longest running game show on Philippine television Family Kuarta o Kahon hosted by Pepe Pimentel (originally aired on ABS-CBN then BBC-2); the latter program had enjoyed its successful 38 year run until it finally pulled the plug during the year 2000. The network also pioneered the use of computer graphics for their program plugs and station IDs, as well as for the broadcasts of its easily recognizable digital clock embedded on the lower left part of the screen during the entire broadcast day except for newscasts, commercials, continuity plugs, station ID, and during sign-off; eventually becoming the centerpiece of the network's broadcasts for 32 years (starting in 1975), until it was abandoned in 2007; and after the fire that razed its first studios on June 6, 1973, RPN moved to the Broadcast Plaza (now ABS-CBN Broadcasting Center) in the same year, and to its current Broadcast City home in July 1978, alongside sister networks Banahaw Broadcasting Corporation (BBC) and Intercontinental Broadcasting Corporation (IBC).

RPN also aired anime programming (making them one of the first to do so in the country) and imported and syndicated programs from the United States. RPN is the first network to cover the Philippine Basketball Association games live in 1976, before the broadcasts moved on to BBC.

On January 15, 1980, RPN began to broadcast primetime programs through its new domestic satellite technology (DOMSAT) in which the 1980s logo resembles a satellite antenna. On May 18, 1982, Eat Bulaga! was also included to the list of the network's DOMSAT-simulcast programs. This made RPN the first national network to achieve nationwide program simulcasting via satellite in 24 TV stations across the Philippines.

The network also became home to, from 1978 up to the early 1980s, the Super Sentai series (making it the first in the Philippines to do so, becoming a pioneer in broadcasting tokusatsu and sentai programs in the country in the process). These made it a reason for the network in 1982 to adopt The Leader as its official slogan, coupled with its Number 9 and the red corporate logos (the latter which is still the current logo of the network up to this day), due to its massive successes as the nation's number one network. In 1986, after the assumption of office of President Corazon Aquino, the government sequestered Radio Philippines Network for allegedly being part of the crony capitalism under the Marcos regime. By then, it was the leading network in the Philippines cornering the highest audience share in the entire country. During the live broadcast of Marcos' inauguration from the Malacañang Palace during the last day of the People Power Revolution, rebels shut down the RPN transmitter in Panay Avenue, and it resumed broadcasts again on March 3, 1986.

First Downfall, Sequestration (1986-1989)
After the People Power Revolution which ousted the dictator Ferdinand Marcos and installed Corazon Aquino  as president in February 1986, the stock and assets of RPN, IBC and BBC were sequestered by the Presidential Commission on Good Government (PCGG). President Corazon Aquino awarded BBC's Channel 2 frequency and its affiliates, through an executive order, to ABS-CBN, and RPN's and IBC's assets were turned over to the Government Communications Group and placed under the management of a Board of Administrators tasked to operate and manage its business and affairs subject to the control and supervision of Presidential Commission on Good Government.

The period saw a major decline for RPN as its resources became outdated and endured major mismanagement which led to the network either shutting down or selling its stations. From being number 1 in the ratings, RPN's ratings slumped, due to the growth of GMA Radio-Television Arts and PTV, and more importantly as a result of ABS-CBN's meteoric rise to the number 1 spot in 1988.

During the post-EDSA Revolution era, RPN launched the first Filipino-created animated series, Ang Panday. By 1989, some of RPN's programming such as John en Marsha and Superstar were cancelled, and TAPE Inc.'s daytime programs Eat Bulaga!, Agila and Coney Reyes on Camera (a co-production with Coney Reyes' CAN Television) moved under a co-production agreement to ABS-CBN, as they saw the resurgent network as a vital element in the sustaining of the three shows' success. By then, the once-dominant RPN had fallen to 4th place, trailing far behind ABS-CBN and GMA and locked in a losing battle with PTV for 3rd place.

New Vision 9 (1989–1994)
In 1989, RPN was renamed as New Vision 9 to recoup lost audience share in the ratings game of Philippine television networks. At the same year, New Vision 9 transmitter's effective radiated power was increased to 1 million watts, ensuing clearer and better signal reception in the Greater Luzon Area. The rebrand took place after RPN and Syndicated Media Access Corporation (SMAC) took over the network's management and marketing. The rebranding, although it proved futile in the turnaround of RPN's ratings, did make history for the network as it pioneered 24-hour television broadcasting in the Philippines. During the latter part of the New Vision 9 era, its ratings further suffered at last place in primetime (behind ABS-CBN, GMA, ABC, IBC, and PTV). Worse yet, RPN's nationwide reach suffered as well as its TV network – In 1989 it composed 24 TV stations nationwide (8 originating stations and 16 Relay stations).

By then, RPN not only had to deal with the continued dominance of ABS-CBN and GMA, but also the return of another station shut down during martial law, ABC, and the onset of cable and UHF channels which started to eat up the audience shares of the least-watched networks.

The second Radio Philippines Network (1994–2007)

Telenovela dominance, emphasis on world-class primetime programming (1994–2003)
In 1994, New Vision 9 was renamed back as Radio Philippines Network (RPN) and in the same year, RPN became the second VHF television network in the Philippines to broadcast in full surround stereo (after GMA Network introduced StereoVision in 1987). Following this, RPN managed to recover in primetime ratings, from dead last in 1994 to fifth place in 1995, beating PTV (which by then suffered a major blow after losing the rights to one of its top-raters, the PBA games, to IBC). This, along with it being number 3 in daytime ratings, helped RPN to challenge ABC for third place in total day ratings.

In 1996, the network quickly regained its foothold when it began to broadcast a Tagalog dub of the 1994 Mexican telenovela Marimar, which turned out to be a phenomenal success, and discombobulating the competition for some time.

The network became the driving force in Tagalog-dubbed foreign programs and movies and made the popular and turnaround its ratings on the evening prime time. Due to the success, the other networks followed and broadcast telenovelas not only from Mexico but also Spanish language telenovelas from the United States, Colombia (GMA 7's Betty La Fea), Venezuela (GMA 7's Samantha and All My Love) and Argentina (GMA 7's Monica Brava) and eventually even drama series from Brazil (ABS-CBN's Ana Manuela) and Asian drama series from Taiwan (notably Meteor Garden) and South Korea (notably Bright Girl). The network also became the home of the cream of the crop amongst the English language television programs around the world; with its strong primetime programming line-up.

This lineup helped RPN maintain its overall 4th place standing in the ratings during the latter half of the 90s, despite later facing competition with UHF stations such as ABS-CBN's Studio 23, which offered more canned programs compared to most VHF stations. In 1999, RPN slid again to fifth place behind ABC, but managed to recover its 4th place standing the following year until early 2003.

Second downfall (2003–2007)
In the mid-2000s, a major network war in the ratings game ensued with the battle of the Taiwanese/Korean-language television series (which started through ABS-CBN's broadcast of Taiwanese series Meteor Garden) between the two leading networks, ABS-CBN and GMA, causing RPN into decline in the telenovelas battle.

On February 19, 2004, Republic Act No. 9250 signed by President Gloria Macapagal Arroyo renewed RPN its congressional franchise for another 25 years. It was also in the same year when the network launched its primetime block, dubbed as The Prime Shift, blocktimed by Solar Entertainment Corporation. The said programming block lasted until 2006 – largely due to continued financial turmoil – shrunk to 24 TV Stations to just 8 TV Stations by 2007.

Solar Entertainment era (2007–2014)

Blocktime with Solar, as C/S;  C/S9; Solar TV (2007–2011)

On March 11, 2007, after its initial tieup with The Prime Shift block, RPN announced a partnership with Solar Entertainment Corporation, an operator of a number of cable channels in the country. The company began co-producing new programming for the network, such as a local version of the Top Model franchise. The network underwent management changes on December 24, 2007, as Tonypet Albano (undersecretary and executive director of Malacañang's Office of Political Coalition Affairs and Deputy Spokesperson of TEAM Unity, now Vice-Governor of Isabela) was appointed chairman of the network (replacing Education Undersecretary Mona Valisno, incumbent Presidential Assistant for Education). Undersecretary Robert Rivera was appointed director of the board, while the president and chief executive officer became former senator Orlando "Orly" Mercado.

Mercado's first major move was to expand their partnerships with Solar Entertainment. Programming from Solar's cable network C/S was added to RPN's lineup at the beginning of the new year, and PBA basketball would also return to the network beginning in the 2008–09 season, as part of Solar Sports' new three-year deal with the league after an expiration of ABC's contract due to the network's rebranding as TV5, because of the blocktime agreement with Malaysian-based Media Prima Berhad subsidiary MPB Primedia, Inc. and intense bidding war with ABS-CBN.

In October 2008, RPN's stations ultimately took on the C/S name as part of their permanent branding, and rebranded itself as C/S 9. On November 29, 2009, the network re-branded again under the new name Solar TV. In late 2010, it was revealed that RPN would no longer carry PBA games, due to planned network re-launch to occur in 2011, with more "feminine" programming.

Privatization; as ETC (2011–2013)

In 2010, the Philippine government began to actively consider privatizing RPN and IBC. Ricardo Abcede, member of the Presidential Commission on Good Government (PCGG), supported the plans, noting that the government should not need to subsidize three state broadcasters when most countries only have one, and could gain a significant profit if they were sold to a major company willing to invest in the stations.

In January 2011, reports confirmed that Solar Entertainment Corporation, through Solar TV Network, and Roberto Benedicto's daughter Kitchie Benedicto now owned a 34% minority share in RPN. Presidential Communications Operations Office (PCOO) secretary Herminio Coloma, Jr. also began to hold meetings with the network's employees union to discuss the financial state of RPN as part of the planned privatization. On February 22, 2011, RPN's employees filed a strike notice, protesting a rumored shutdown of RPN on February 25, and accusing the government of attempting to privatize RPN without actively consulting its employees.

On February 25, 2011, RPN signed off temporarily in preparation for a relaunch as ETC on March 2, 2011. Additional shares in RPN were sold to Far East Managers and Investors Inc. (FEMI), an organization company affiliated with Ambassador Roberto Benedicto (founder of RPN). The government would retain People's Television Network to serve as the sole state broadcaster of the country. However, due to privatization, RPN is forced to retrench 200 employees and stopping the production of RPN NewsWatch, its last RPN-produced program, on October 29, 2012, as Solar TV takes over the entire RPN's airtime.

As Solar News Channel (2013–2014)
In November 2013, it was reported that San Miguel Corporation President and COO Ramon S. Ang is reportedly interested in acquiring Solar Television Network.

On November 30, 2013, ETC returned to SBN while Solar News Channel moved to RPN since the following day to widen its nationwide telecast. (SBN broadcasts ETC from 2008 to 2011)

Nine Media era (2014–present)

As 9TV (2014–2015)

On January 3, 2014, RPN and Aliw Broadcasting Corporation (ABC) signed a memorandum of agreement for the expanded coverage of both the TV and radio networks nationwide. Selected DWIZ programs will be simulcast on the Radyo Ronda Network.

On August 20, 2014, Solar Entertainment Corporation chief Wilson Tieng announced that he ceded his entire share on Solar TV Network, Inc., including its 34% majority share on RPN, to Antonio Cabangon Chua, owner of business daily BusinessMirror and Aliw Broadcasting Corporation. Tieng sold Solar TV because they are losing money for operations and he will be focusing instead on the remaining television channels he personally owned through Solar Entertainment Corporation.

To reflect the change of ownership, on August 13, 2014, Solar Television Network and RPN announced the rebranding of Solar News Channel into 9TV by August 23, dropping the Solar branding.
9TV retained the news and current affairs programming while expanding its weekend programming to cater more audiences with the launching of Kids Weekend, Small Acts, Big Stories, Something to Chew On and Boys Ride Out.

However, the 9TV branding was done to transition from the Tieng to the Cabangon-Chua ownership. On October 14, 2014, Nine Media Corporation (formerly Solar Television Network) inked a 5-year brand licensing agreement with the Turner Broadcasting System to rebrand 9TV into CNN Philippines as the Philippine franchisee of CNN, and the third local CNN channel in Asia (after CNN Indonesia and India's CNN-IBN). CNN Philippines was officially launched on March 16, 2015.

As CNN Philippines (2015–present)
On March 16, 2015, 9TV started broadcasting on CNN Philippines brand. CNN Philippines is the seventh rebrand of Radio Philippines Network since its inception as Kanlaon Broadcasting System. It dropped the transitional brand 9TV after seven months of operations under such brand. The new brand reflects the CNN format of news reporting with news from the Philippines.

In 2017, RPN and Nine Media Corporation acquired its UHF transmitter complex in Crestview Heights Subdivision, Brgy. San Roque, Antipolo, Rizal from Progressive Broadcasting Corporation to use RPN's Digital terrestrial television broadcast in Metro Manila and nearby provinces.

Programming

CNN Philippines programs

Previous RPN-produced Programs

RPN Stations Nationwide

See also
 CNN Philippines News and Current Affairs
 Intercontinental Broadcasting Corporation
 People's Television Network
 Philippine Broadcasting Service

References

External links
 
 CNN Philippines Website

 
Television networks in the Philippines
Philippine radio networks
Television in Metro Manila
Mass media companies of the Philippines
Television channels and stations established in 1960
English-language television stations in the Philippines
Nine Media Corporation
Publicly funded broadcasters
Peabody Award winners
Mass media companies established in 1960
Television channels and stations established in 1969
Companies based in Quezon City
Presidential Communications Group (Philippines)